Cabalzarite is a rare arsenate mineral with the chemical formula . It is a member of the tsumcorite group. It crystallizes in the monoclinic system and typically occurs as clusters of crystals or granular aggregates.

It was first described for samples from an abandoned manganese mine in Falotta, Graubünden, Switzerland and named for Swiss amateur mineralogist Walter Cabalzar. It was approved as a new mineral by the IMA in 1997. It has also been reported from the Aghbar mine in Ouarzazate Province, Morocco.

References

Arsenate minerals
Monoclinic minerals
Minerals in space group 12